Francis Woolley (born 11 February 1957) is an Australian former cricketer. He played two List A matches for Tasmania between 1983 and 1984.

See also
 List of Tasmanian representative cricketers

References

External links
 

1957 births
Living people
Australian cricketers
Tasmania cricketers
Cricketers from Launceston, Tasmania